Ponerorchis graminifolia is a species of flowering plant in the family Orchidaceae, native to southern Korea and Japan. They are short herbaceous perennials, growing from a tuber, with small flowers in shades of pink to purple. Many varieties and cultivars are grown in Japan as ornamental plants. The Japanese name for the species is transcribed as uchou-ran or utyouran.

Description
Ponerorchis graminifolia is a short herbaceous perennial growing from an ovoid tuber. It reaches a height of 10–15 cm (less often 25 cm). It has two to four linear leaves, 7–15 cm long. The inflorescence is a raceme containing 2–15 flowers. Each flower is about 15 mm across, pink to purplish overall. The upper sepal and the lateral petals form a "helmet". The lip or labellum is about 13 mm long, deeply divided into three broad lobes. A spur is present, 10–15 mm long, shorter than the ovary.

Several varieties have been described, some of which vary in flower colour. P. graminifolia var. kurokamiana has reddish purple flowers;  
P. graminifolia var. nigropunctata has paler flowers with darker spots or spotted lines.

Taxonomy
Ponerorchis graminifolia was first described in 1852, by Heinrich Gustav Reichenbach; it is the type species of the genus Ponerorchis. The genus name is derived from the Greek πονηρός, meaning "wretched", "worthless", "useless". The specific epithet graminifolia means "grass-leaved".

, four varieties have been recognized:
Ponerorchis graminifolia var. graminifolia – Japan and Korea
Ponerorchis graminifolia var. kurokamiana (Hatus. & Ohwi) T.Hashim. – Japan; only up to 10 cm tall; reddish purple flowers
Ponerorchis graminifolia var. nigropunctata F.Maek. ex K.Inoue (as var. micropunctata in some sources) – Japan; up to 25 cm tall; flowers paler with darker spots
Ponerorchis graminifolia var. suzukiana (Ohwi) Soó – Japan; more and larger leaves (4–6); pale reddish purple flowers

Distribution and habitat
Ponerorchis graminifolia is native to south Korea and south-central and south Japan (Honshu, Shikoku and Kyushu). It grows in mountainous areas, particularly among damp rocks.

Cultivation
Ponerorchis graminifolia is cultivated as an ornamental plant, particularly in Japan, where many cultivars of uchou-ran have been described with widely differing flower colours and markings, from pure white to darkish purple, with or without spots and markings. In Britain, they can be grown in pots in a gritty compost. Without forcing, they then come into growth in early spring, flower in late spring and early summer, dying down before the autumn, after which they are kept dry and frost-free over winter. Propagation is via tuber division or seed.

Hybrids with Ponerorchis chidorii and Ponerorchis gracilis (Amitostigma gracile) have been reported to be in cultivation.

References

graminifolia
Flora of Japan
Flora of Korea